Protea obtusifolia is a species of Protea. It is native to the Cape Provinces of South Africa.

References

External links

obtusifolia
Flora of the Cape Provinces